The 2014–15 William & Mary Tribe women's basketball team represents The College of William & Mary during the 2014–15 NCAA Division I women's basketball season. The Tribe, led by second year head coach Ed Swanson, play their home games at Kaplan Arena and were members of the Colonial Athletic Association. They finished the season 15–16, 9–9 in CAA play to finish in fifth place. They lost in the quarterfinals of the CAA women's tournament to Hofstra. They were invited to the Women's Basketball Invitational where they lost in the first round to Xavier.

Roster

Schedule

|-
!colspan=9 style="background:#115740; color:#B9975B;"| Regular season

|-
!colspan=9 style="background:#115740; color:#B9975B;"|2015 CAA Tournament

|-
!colspan=9 style="background:#115740; color:#B9975B;"|Women's Basketball Invitational

See also
2014–15 William & Mary Tribe men's basketball team

References

William & Mary Tribe women's basketball seasons
William And Mary
William And Mary
William
William